Michael Timothy Pagliarulo, a.k.a. "Pags" (born March 15, 1960), is an American former professional baseball third baseman and later the hitting coach of the Miami Marlins. He played in Major League Baseball for the New York Yankees, San Diego Padres, Minnesota Twins, Baltimore Orioles, and Texas Rangers, and in Nippon Professional Baseball for the Seibu Lions.

Playing career

Pagliarulo graduated from Medford High School in Massachusetts in 1978 and played college baseball at the University of Miami for the Miami Hurricanes. In 1980, he played collegiate summer baseball with the Chatham A's of the Cape Cod Baseball League. He was drafted by the New York Yankees in sixth round of the 1981 Major League Baseball draft.

Pagliarulo joined the parent club on July 1, 1984, and spent just over five years with the Yankees before going to the San Diego Padres in 1989. After a year and a half in San Diego, Pagliarulo moved back to the American League when he joined the Minnesota Twins just before the start of the 1991 season. It was with Minnesota that Pagliarulo won his only World Series championship as the starting third baseman in 1991. Pagliarulo remained with Minnesota for the following 1992 season and part of the 1993 season. He was acquired by the Orioles on August 15, 1993, in a transaction that was completed the following day when Erik Schullstrom was sent to the Twins. At the time, the Orioles needed depth at third base with Leo Gómez on the disabled list but had been unsuccessful in its pursuit of the Cincinnati Reds' Chris Sabo.

Pagliarulo was out of Major League Baseball during the strike-shortened 1994 season, playing the season for the Japanese league's Seibu Lions, where he was a teammate of current Lions manager Tsutomu Ito.

At the age of 35, Pagliarulo resumed his career when he signed with the Texas Rangers, where he finished his career before retiring after the 1995 season.

Coaching career
Before the 1998 season, Pagliarulo turned down multiple minor league contracts and big league coaching job offers in order to stay with his family in Massachusetts and coach at Winchester High School.

From 2013–13, Pagilarulo served as the hitting coach for Triple-A Indianapolis Indians.

In 2016, the Miami Marlins hired Pagliarulo as their hitting coach.  Pagilarulo was fired from that position in April 2019.

Personal life
Mike married his high school sweetheart and best friend Karen in 1983. They have two kids, Michael and Erica.

His son, Michael, was a member of the 2009 Ivy League champion Dartmouth Big Green baseball team.

His daughter, Erica, was the leading scorer for the Rollins College Women’s Lacrosse team’s most successful season in program history.

References

External links

Mike Pagliarulo at Baseball Almanac

1960 births
Living people
American people of Italian descent
American expatriate baseball players in Japan
Baseball players from Massachusetts
Baltimore Orioles players
Chatham Anglers players
Columbus Clippers players
Fort Myers Miracle players
Greensboro Hornets players
Los Angeles Angels of Anaheim scouts
Major League Baseball hitting coaches
Major League Baseball third basemen
Miami Marlins coaches
Miami Hurricanes baseball players
Minnesota Twins players
Nashville Sounds players
New York Yankees players
Nippon Professional Baseball infielders
Oneonta Yankees players
People from Winchester, Massachusetts
San Diego Padres players
Seibu Lions players
Sportspeople from Middlesex County, Massachusetts
Sportspeople from Medford, Massachusetts
Texas Rangers players
Baseball coaches from Massachusetts
High school baseball coaches in the United States